Pension Law Reform (1993) Cm 2342, also known as the Goode Report after its leading author, Roy Goode, was a UK government commissioned inquiry into the state of pensions in the United Kingdom, which ultimately led to a set of statutory reforms in the Pensions Act 1995.

Background
A series of scandals and corporate collapses in the late 1980s and early 1990s had led to losses to occupational pension funds, and brought public pressure for changes to pension regulation. In particular, Robert Maxwell, the proprietor of the Mirror News Group had suddenly died and it was then revealed that he had been stealing millions of pounds from his employees' pension schemes.

See also
UK company law
UK labour law

References

Pensions in the United Kingdom